To Play the Fool is the second book in the Kate Martinelli series by Laurie R. King. Preceded by A Grave Talent and followed by the novel With Child, it describes the investigation into the murder of a homeless man.

Plot summary
A homeless man is murdered and Kate must determine the culprit's identity. Everything seems to point to a man whom the homeless community regards as an important religious figure.

Characters in To Play the Fool
Kate Martinelli is a member of the San Francisco Police Department.
Lee Cooper is Kate's lover.
Al Hawkin is Kate's partner at work.

Allusions/references to other works
The title is taken from William Shakespeare's Twelfth Night (Act 3, scene 1), in which Feste the jester is described as "wise enough to play the fool."

References

External links 
 Laurie R. King official website
 To Play the Fool at Laurie King's website

1995 American novels
Kate Martinelli (novel series)
Fictional portrayals of the San Francisco Police Department